Pretty Filthy is a 2015 musical with a book by Bess Wohl and music and lyrics by Michael Friedman developed with director Steve Cosson. The musical is produced by American "investigative" theater company The Civilians. The show is based on The Civilians' visit to the San Fernando Valley, also known as "the Hollywood of the adult film industry." The musical focuses on the private and professional lives of either real-life adult film stars or composite characters based on various people, with each actor playing multiple roles.

Originally commissioned by Center Theatre Group in Los Angeles, the show premiered Off-Broadway at The Playhouse in the Abrons Arts Center and ran from January 31 to March 1, 2015.

Cast and characters

Musical numbers
Names — Full Company
What If I Like It — Becky/Taylor and Company
Impossible Girls — Sam Spiegel
Porn Capitalism — Carrie and Brown Sugar
The First Video Stars — Georgina Congress
Squirting 101 — Fredo
Becky & Bobby & Taylor & Dick — Becky/Taylor and Bobby/Dick
Waiting for Wood — Male Company
Porn House — Full Company
Fuck the World — Peter North/Matt Ramsey
Applesauce — Holly and Oscar
Beautiful — Georgina Congress
Pretty/Filthy — Becky/Taylor and Company

Recording
The original cast recording was released on November 18, 2016 by Ghostlight Records.

Awards and nominations

Original Off-Broadway production

References

External links
Internet Off-Broadway Database

Plays by Michael Friedman
LGBT-related musicals
2015 musicals
Off-Broadway musicals
Plays based on real people
Plays about actors
Works about pornography
Cultural depictions of pornographic film actors